Sanja Starović (born 25 March 1983) is a Serbian professional volleyball player. She has played for Serbia women's national volleyball team, competing in the 2012 Summer Olympics.

Career
Starović won the silver medal in the 2012 FIVB Club World Championship, playing with the Azerbaijani club Rabita Baku.

Starović's club, Rabita Baku won the Bronze medal of the 2013–14 CEV Champions League after falling 0-3 to the Russian Dinamo Kazan in the semifinals, but defeating 3-0 to the Turkish Eczacıbaşı VitrA Istanbul in the third place match.

Personal life
Her brother, Saša Starović is also a volleyball player.

Awards

Individuals
 2009–10 CEV Cup Final Four "Best spiker"

Clubs
 2011 FIVB Club World Championship -  Champion, with Rabita Baku
 2012 FIVB Club World Championship -  Runner-Up, with Rabita Baku
 2012–13 CEV Champions League -  Runner-Up, with Rabita Baku
 2013–14 CEV Champions League –  Bronze medal, with Rabita Baku

References

1983 births
Serbian women's volleyball players
Living people
Olympic volleyball players of Serbia
Volleyball players at the 2012 Summer Olympics
Serbian expatriate sportspeople in Italy
Serbian expatriate sportspeople in Turkey
Serbian expatriate sportspeople in Azerbaijan
Universiade medalists in volleyball
Universiade silver medalists for Serbia